Ulrike Hölzl (born 3 February 1975) is an Austrian snowboarder. She competed in women's halfpipe at the 1998 Winter Olympics in Nagano.

References

External links

1975 births
Living people
Austrian female snowboarders
Olympic snowboarders of Austria
Snowboarders at the 1998 Winter Olympics